The largest offshore wind power facilities are listed at List of offshore wind farms.

By country 
 List of offshore wind farms in China
 List of offshore wind farms in Denmark
 List of offshore wind farms in Germany
 List of offshore wind farms in Japan
 List of offshore wind farms in the Netherlands
 List of offshore wind farms in Sweden
 List of offshore wind farms in the United Kingdom
 List of offshore wind farms in the United States

By body of water 
 List of offshore wind farms in the Baltic Sea
 List of offshore wind farms in the Irish Sea
 List of offshore wind farms in the North Sea

See also

Lists of wind farms by country

 
Lists related to renewable energy